The Kenya national cricket team toured Ireland in 2008. They played three One Day Internationals against Ireland.

ODI series

1st ODI

2nd ODI

3rd ODI

Kenyan cricket tours abroad